Hargeisa Canadian Medical Center (HCMC) is a medical and research center located in Hargeisa, Somaliland. It was founded in 1999, and is one of the pre-eminent medical facilities in the country. It consists of a walk-in clinic, a diagnostic center, a medical laboratory and a pharmacy.

Overview
All of the physicians that work at the Hargeisa Canadian Medical Center were trained in Italy and/or Canada.

HCMC is known for its humanitarian endeavors, such as offering free medical treatment on Mondays and Thursdays to low or no income families. The hospital's physicians also often travel to impoverished villages and treat the locals.

As of May 2011, the medical center has been expanded into a hospital.

References
Xanuunadda Macaanka, Dhiigkarka Iyo Uur ku jirta Oo Ku Soo Badanaya Somaliland - Ramaasnews.com

1999 establishments in Somalia
Organisations based in Hargeisa
Hospitals in Somaliland
Hospitals established in 1999